Romania is competing at the 2013 World Aquatics Championships in Barcelona, Spain between 19 July and 4 August 2013.

Diving

Romania qualified a single quota for the following diving events.

Women

Swimming

Romanian swimmers achieved qualifying standards in the following events (up to a maximum of 2 swimmers in each event at the A-standard entry time, and 1 at the B-standard):

Men

Women

Water polo

Men's tournament

Team roster

Dragoș Stoenescu
Petru Ianc
Tiberiu Negrean
Nicolae Diaconu
Daniel Teohari
Andrei Bușilă
Alexandru Matei
Mihnea Chioveanu
Dimitri Goantă
Ramiro Georgescu
Alexandru Ghiban
Andrei Crețu
Mihai Drăgușin

Group play

Round of 16

References

External links
Barcelona 2013 Official Site
Federatiei Romane de Natatie si Pentatlon Modern 

Nations at the 2013 World Aquatics Championships
2013 in Romanian sport
Romania at the World Aquatics Championships